The Book of Heavy Metal is the 3rd full length album by the Swedish heavy metal band Dream Evil. This is the last album to feature Gus G. and Snowy Shaw.

Track listing

Notes 
"Let's Make Rock" is omitted from this album because it appears as track 13 for the Japanese edition of  2003's "Evilized".

The shout present at the beginning of "The Book of Heavy Metal" on the U.S. version is removed and placed as the intro to "The Enemy" instead.

DVD
 "Tour 2003" (Footage of the band on tour, and live footage of the band performing 'M.O.M.', 'Children Of The Night' and 'Heavy Metal In The Night') – 35:13
  "The Making Of The Book Of Heavy Metal" (The making of the band's new album) – 26:26

Personnel
Band
Niklas Isfeldt - vocals
Fredrik Nordström - rhythm guitars, backing vocals
Gus G. - lead guitars
Peter Stålfors - bass, backing vocals
Snowy Shaw - drums, backing vocals

Guest/Session members
Mats Olausson - organ and keyboards on 2, 5, 8, 10, and 12
Andy Alkman - 2nd lead vocals on 4
Per Edvardsson - harmony vocals on 5 and 11
Patrik J. - choir vocals on 1, 3, 4, 5, 7 and 10
Råberra Axelsson - guitar solo on 1
"Metal" Mike Chlasciak - guitar solo on 4

References 

2004 albums
Dream Evil albums
Century Media Records albums
Albums produced by Fredrik Nordström